Caryophyllus is an archaic, no longer used name of two unrelated plant genera:
Syzygium, in the family Myrtaceae
Dianthus, in the family Caryophyllaceae